Aaron Evans Nemane (born 26 September 1997) is a French professional footballer who plays as a midfielder for National League club Notts County. He played for Amiens SC and Manchester City when he was younger.

Early life
Nemane was born in Amiens, France but was raised in Blackley, Manchester. He has not yet decided on his international future as he qualifies for both the French and English national teams. However, he has disclosed a preference to play for France.

Career
Nemane joined Rangers on 22 August 2017, on a five-month loan from Manchester City. He made his professional debut by replacing Daniel Candeias for the final four minutes of a 4–1 win over Dundee on 9 September 2017.

Nemane joined Go Ahead Eagles on loan after the end of his loan at Rangers.

On 30 August 2018, Nemane joined Belgian side Tubize on loan.

On 14 December 2019, Nemane joined English National League team Torquay United.

On 20 July 2021, he joined English National League club Notts County, having rejected a new contract from Torquay United.

Career statistics

References

External links

1997 births
Living people
English footballers
French footballers
Association football midfielders
Rangers F.C. players
Manchester City F.C. players
Go Ahead Eagles players
A.F.C. Tubize players
Torquay United F.C. players
Notts County F.C. players
Scottish Professional Football League players
National League (English football) players